Blosyrus inaequalis, is a species of weevil found in India and Sri Lanka.

Description
This species has a body length is about 4.5 to 6.5 mm. Body black, with dense uniform brown or grey scales. Head with five short frontal longitudinal sulci. Rostrum slightly narrowed anteriorly. Antennae with the two basal-joints of the funicle subequal with elongate club. Prothorax strongly transverse and rugose with a few large tubercle. Elytra globose with oblique shoulders and deeply sinuate basal margin. Spermatheca with strongly curved ramus.

Biology
They are known as minor pests on cluster beans, and sesame.

References 

Curculionidae
Insects of Sri Lanka
Beetles described in 1916